Ronnie Brunswijkstadion is an association football stadium located in Moengo, Suriname. The stadium is owned and operated by the Surinamese politician Ronnie Brunswijk, and the main tenant is Inter Moengotapoe, a football club that competes in Suriname's top league, the Topklasse. The capacity is around 3,000.

References

External links
 Profile at World Stadiums

Football venues in Suriname
Multi-purpose stadiums in Suriname
Sports venues completed in 2002
2002 establishments in Suriname
Inter Moengotapoe